Xiaolian (literally "filial and incorrupt"), was the standard of nominating civil officers started by Emperor Wu of Han in 134 BC. It lasted until its replacement by the imperial examination system during the Sui Dynasty. In Confucian philosophy, filial piety is a virtue of respect for one's parents and ancestors.

Under the advice of Dong Zhongshu, Emperor Wu ordered each commandery to recommend one filial and one incorrupt candidate for civil offices. Later the nomination became proportional; Emperor He of Han changed the proportion to one candidate for every 200,000 residents, and one for every 100,000 residents in ethnic minority regions. The nominator was also responsible if the nominee was charged with corruption, and could be punished if he refused to nominate qualified individuals.

After the Han dynasty, high positions were usually nominated according to the Nine-rank system, so Xiaolian became increasingly unimportant. During the Sui dynasty, both systems were replaced by the imperial examination system.

References

Education in China
History of Imperial China
134 BC
2nd-century BC establishments in China
130s BC establishments